Mahajamba Usine is a town and commune in Madagascar. It belongs to the district of Mahajanga II, which is a part of Boeny Region. The population of the commune was estimated to be approximately 14,000 in 2001 commune census.

Mahajamba Usine is served by a local airport. Primary and junior level secondary education are available in town. The majority 80% of the population of the commune are farmers.  The most important crops are rice and peanuts, while other important agricultural products are bananas and cassava.  Industry and services provide employment for 7% and 2% of the population, respectively. Additionally fishing employs 11% of the population.

References and notes 

Populated places in Boeny